This list of books on films is for books dedicated to individual films, film series, or related critical analyses.

American films
Avatar (2009)

Birth of a Nation (1915)

Bringing Up Baby (1938)

Casablanca (1942)

Citizen Kane (1941)

Cold Mountain (2003)
 
Eyes Wide Shut (1999)

Full Metal Jacket (1987)

[[The Godfather (film series)|The Godfather trilogy]] (1972–90)

Gone with the Wind (1939)The Graduate (1967)

It's a Wonderful Life (1946)

Lolita (1962)

Psycho (1960)

Schindler's List (1993)

[[Star Wars|Star Wars franchise]] (1977–)

Sunset Boulevard (1950)

 (screenplay)Tootsie (1982)

Touch of Evil (1958)

Vertigo (1958)

The Wizard of Oz (1939)

Asian films

Hong Kong
A Better Tomorrow (1986)

Ashes of Time (1994)

An Autumn's Tale (1987)

Bullet in the Head (1990)

Center Stage (1991)

Durian Durian (2000)

Happy Together (1997)

He's a Woman, She's a Man (1994)

Internal Affairs (2002–03)

The Killer (1989)

Made in Hong Kong (1997)

PTU (2003)

Song of the Exile (1990)

Wing Chun (1994)

Indian
The Apu Trilogy (1955–59)

Mother India (1957)

Japanese

A Page of Madness (1926)

Rashomon (1950)

Seven Samurai (1954)

Tokyo Story (1953)

Taiwanese 
A Touch of Zen (1971)

European films

British 
2001: A Space Odyssey (1968)

A Clockwork Orange (1971)

Lawrence of Arabia (1962)

Sense and Sensibility (1995)

French
Breathless / À bout de souffle (1960)

The Rules of the Game / La Regle de Jeu (1939)

German
The Cabinet of Dr. Caligari / Das Cabinet Des Dr Caligari (1920)

Nosferatu (1922)

Italian 
8½ (1963)

New Zealand
[[The Lord of the Rings (film series)|The Lord of the Rings Trilogy]] (2001–03)The Piano (1993)
Margolis, Harriet, editor (2000). Jane Campion's "The Piano". Cambridge University Press. .

See also
Stanley Kubrick bibliography
Alfred Hitchcock bibliography

External links
BFI Film Classics
Rutgers at WorldCat

Bibliographies of film
Books
Films